The 2015 Delray Beach Open featured a team tennis competition between Team USA and Team International. The event is officially recognized by the ATP Champions Tour.

Each team is composed by 3 players, and each player will face all 3 players of the other team. A win awards a point for his respective team. All matches are played at best of 3 sets, with a champions tie-break at the third set if necessary.

Team International won the tournament 6–3 over Team USA.

This tournament marked the official debut of James Blake in the ATP Champions Tour, after retiring from professional tennis in 2012. Blake qualified to the tour after winning the Davis Cup in 2007.

Players
The draw was confirmed on 13 February 2015

Team USA
  James Blake
  Brad Gilbert
  Justin Gimelstob
  Michael Chang (withdrew due to a hamstring injury, replaced by Gimelstob)
Team International
  Goran Ivanišević
  Mark Philippoussis
  Mikael Pernfors
  Emilio Sánchez (withdrew due to a groin injury, replaced by Pernfors)

Draw
All times are local, EST (UTC−5).

Day 1 (13 February)
Matches started at 18:00

Day 2 (14 February)
Matches started at 12:00

Day 3 (15 February)
Matches started at 12:00

Winners

References

External links
 Official Results Archive (ATP) 

2015 Team Legends